Pettigalawatta Grama Niladhari Division is a Grama Niladhari Division of the Galle Four Gravets Divisional Secretariat of Galle District of Southern Province, Sri Lanka. It has Grama Niladhari Division Code 99B.

Closenberg Hotel are located within, nearby or associated with Pettigalawatta.

Pettigalawatta is a surrounded by the Magalle, Makuluwa, Weliwatta and Thalapitiya Grama Niladhari Divisions.

Demographics

Ethnicity 

The Pettigalawatta Grama Niladhari Division has a Sinhalese majority (98.3%). In comparison, the Galle Four Gravets Divisional Secretariat (which contains the Pettigalawatta Grama Niladhari Division) has a Sinhalese majority (66.8%) and a significant Moor population (32.1%)

Religion 

The Pettigalawatta Grama Niladhari Division has a Buddhist majority (96.5%). In comparison, the Galle Four Gravets Divisional Secretariat (which contains the Pettigalawatta Grama Niladhari Division) has a Buddhist majority (65.7%) and a significant Muslim population (32.3%)

Gallery

References 

Grama Niladhari Divisions of Galle Four Gravets Divisional Secretariat